Yao Di (born 17 March 1982) is a Chinese actress.

Early life and education
Yao was born in Tongxiang, Jiaxing, Zhejiang on March 17, 1982. She graduated from Beijing Film Academy.
At the age of 18, Yao entered the entertainment industry.

Career
Yao rose to fame for her roles in television series The Dream of Red Mansions (2010).

In 2011, Yao starred in the romance drama Naked Marriage. The TV drama became a national sensation, and Yao was given the title of "Nation's Girlfriend" by the Chinese media.

The following year, Yao starred in the youth drama Beijing Youth, about teens in Beijing struggling against the strict and traditional culture of their parents. The drama was well received among young Chinese mainland audiences.

In 2013, Yao's fame continued to rise after she starred in two TV dramas, New Dating Era and Love Is Not Blind, which is adapted from a 2011 Chinese movie of the same name. She was named the Most Popular Actress by Youku.

However, in 2014, her affair with actor Wen Zhang was exposed. Her reputation was greatly damaged, and this temporarily halted her film career.

Personal life
In 2014, Yao was found to have an affair with actor Wen Zhang while Wen's legal wife Ma Yili just gave birth to their second daughter. Some rumors suggested that their secret romance began when Ma was pregnant. Wen apologized to his family when he was caught by the media while Yao was widely blamed by the public through social media. Yao chose to keep silent after the disputed event and tried to escape from the public.

Filmography

Film

Television series

Discography

Awards and nominations

References

External links

1982 births
Actresses from Jiaxing
Beijing Film Academy alumni
Living people
Chinese film actresses
Chinese television actresses
21st-century Chinese actresses